NCH Software is an Australian software company founded in 1993 in Canberra, Australia. The Colorado office was started in April 2008 due to the large U.S. customer base.

Software products
NCH Software provides software programs for audio, video, business, dictation and transcription, graphics, telephony and other utilities. On September 26, 2014, cnet.com showed their most-frequently downloaded program from NCH Software was WavePad Sound Editor Masters Edition.

VideoPad is the firm's video editing application for the home and professional market. It is part of a suite that integrates with other software created by the company. This other software includes WavePad, a sound-editing program; MixPad, a sound-mixing program; PhotoPad, a photo and image editor; Prism a video format converter; Express Burn, disc burning software; Switch, an audio format converter, Express Scribe, a transcription software and Debut, a screen recorder and video capture software.

Controversy
During 2013, some computer security companies categorized NCH software as bloatware because it bundled the Google Toolbar. In July 2015, NCH Software announced it was no longer bundling the Google toolbar. As of November 30, 2015, NCH Software is marked clean by all major antivirus products.  That said, if you install their software, they create context menus for several file types that are not at all related to an installed product.  For instance, right-click a tar file on your Windows machine and an option to download and install their file compression program appears.  This behavior occurs despite the fact that only a sound processing program was installed on the user machine.

Software nags to be run again after 14 days and application shortcuts on the desktop "wiggle" to prompt you to click on them.

Software licenses only receive updates for 3 months, this is hardcoded into the application, no new features, bug fixes or security updates are received after this unless you go back to an unregistered version or buy a new license.

All software on the website is always listed as a percentage off at all times, the percentage varies twice a month, but the software has never been sold at the full price (Often over $100)

References

External links
 NCH Software Official Site
 NCH Software Audio Site

Software companies of Australia
Software companies established in 1993
Privately held companies of Australia
Companies based in Canberra
Australian companies established in 1993